Chloë is the debut album of Irish singer Chloë Agnew. It was released in 2002 by Celtic Collection records. In 2008, it was released in the United States via Valley Entertainment.

Track listing

Personnel
Adapted from CD Universe's product description.
Chloë Agnew - Voice
David Agnew - Oboe
Liz Foster  - Background vocals

References

External links 
Chloë at Discogs

2002 debut albums